Fox Conner (November 2, 1874 – October 13, 1951) was a major general of the United States Army. He served as operations officer for the American Expeditionary Force during World War I, and is best remembered as a mentor to the generation of officers who led the army in World War II, particularly as "the man who made Eisenhower".

Early life
Conner was born at Slate Springs, in Calhoun County, Mississippi. His father, Robert Herbert Conner, was a soldier in the Confederate States Army who was wounded several times during the American Civil War. In his final engagement, the Battle of Atlanta, Robert Conner was shot in the head and lost his sight. After the war he was nicknamed "Blind Bob". He learned to gauge the grades of cotton by touch, and became a successful cotton trader. In addition, he began teaching at the Slate Springs Academy. The school had been founded by Conner's uncle Fuller Fox in 1872, and several members of the Fox family were on the faculty. Robert Conner met Nancy (Nannie) Hughes Fox when both were teaching at the academy, and they married on 30 December 1873.

Conner was educated in Slate Springs, and was an avid reader of The Youth's Companion magazine. After turning eighteen, he wanted to embark on a career in the military, so his uncle recommended him to Representative Hernando Money for appointment to the United States Military Academy. Money nominated Conner on 31 May 1893.

Early career

Conner graduated as a second lieutenant in the Class of 1898, in which he ranked 17th. He was assigned to the 1st Artillery Regiment. The army denied his several requests for transfer to the Cavalry.

Conner's first posting was to Fort Adams in Newport, Rhode Island. After brief assignments in Huntsville, Alabama and Savannah, Georgia he was sent to Cuba in January 1899 to serve with the United States occupation force following the Spanish–American War.

In August 1900, Conner was reassigned to Washington Barracks (today named Fort McNair) in Washington, D.C. He was promoted to captain in 1901 and was transferred to Fort Hamilton, New York in November 1901 as commander of the 123rd Coast Artillery Company. He held this assignment until August 1905 when he began attendance at the Army Staff College at Fort Leavenworth, Kansas. He then served as adjutant of the Artillery sub-post at Fort Riley, Kansas from July 1906 to May 1907.

In September 1907, Conner was assigned to the Army's General Staff and also as a student at the Army War College from which he graduated in July 1911. He was then attached to the French 22nd Field Artillery Regiment in Versailles, France from October 1911 to October 1912.

Following his return to the United States, Conner commanded Artillery batteries in the Western states and on the Mexican border. In July 1916, Conner was promoted to major and assigned to the Inspector General's office in Washington. He was in this position when the United States declared war on Germany in April 1917.

World War I

In June, Conner was selected by Major General John J. Pershing to be a member of the operations section (G3) for the American Expeditionary Forces (AEF) staff in France. He was promoted to lieutenant colonel on May 15, 1917 and to temporary colonel on August 5. In November Conner was selected as Pershing's Assistant Chief of Staff for Operations (G3); his subordinates included John McAuley Palmer and George C. Marshall. Conner developed an immense respect for both men, and later referred to Marshall as the ideal soldier and a military genius.

Conner was promoted to temporary brigadier general on August 8, 1918. After the Armistice was signed in November, Conner was assigned to the Army General Staff in Washington and was promoted to permanent colonel on August 22, 1919.

Conner gained Pershing's respect and admiration during the war, causing Pershing to write to Conner that:

In 1920, a subcommittee of the House of Representatives launched an investigation in the losses among United States Army personnel that had occurred in the hours between the time when the Armistice of 11 November 1918 had been signed and the time when it came into effect. During the hearings, Conner drew heavy criticism from Congressman Oscar E. Bland and was named by Brigadier General John H. Sherburne, of the Massachusetts National Guard and the former commander of the artillery of the African American 92nd Division, as the individual most responsible for not stopping a scheduled attack by the 92nd Division of Robert Lee Bullard's Second Army. The panel members rejected Sherburne's assertion and the final report of the subcommittee held no one person accountable for the losses.

For his service as the "brain" of the AEF, Conner was awarded the Army Distinguished Service Medal and the French Croix de Guerre. After the war, Conner and Palmer received credit for writing the after-action report on World War I operations which influenced the content of the National Defense Act of 1920 and set the course for the interwar army.

Army Distinguished Service Medal citation

Conner and Eisenhower

Conner's most remembered contribution to the army was his mentorship of promising subordinates, most notably Dwight Eisenhower. Conner first met Eisenhower "in Autumn of 1920, introduced by George S. Patton at a Sunday dinner at the Pattons." Eisenhower would later note that perhaps the greatest reward of his friendship with Patton was being introduced to Conner. Conner and Eisenhower immediately developed a great mutual respect: "Conner became Eisenhower's teacher and a father figure whom he admired above all others." Following his promotion to permanent brigadier general in 1921, Conner took command of the 20th Infantry Brigade in Panama. He invited Eisenhower to join his staff and for three years Conner conducted a systematic course of study for Eisenhower that ranged from extensive readings in military history to daily practical experience writing field orders for every aspect of the command.

Conner had three principles or rules of war for a democracy that he imparted to both Eisenhower and Marshall. They were:
 Never fight unless you have to;
 Never fight alone; and
 Never fight for long.

Of particular importance to Eisenhower's later career, Conner emphasized the importance of coalition command in preparation for the inevitable war. Said Eisenhower,

Conner pulled strings to get his protégé admitted to the Command and Staff School at Fort Leavenworth, where Eisenhower graduated first in his class thanks in no small part to his comprehensive Panamanian tutelage, in addition to the class notes Eisenhower received from Patton, who had attended the school earlier.

Eisenhower later commented on Conner's abilities: "Outside of my parents he had more influence on me and my outlook than any other individual, especially in regard to the military profession."

Later service
Conner left Panama in late 1924 to assume his duties in Washington as the Army's Assistant Chief of Staff for Logistics (G-4), which started on December 1, 1924.

Conner was promoted to major general on October 20, 1925 and assigned as Deputy Chief of Staff of the Army on March 9, 1926. He commanded the 1st Division at Fort Hamilton from May 1 to September 1, 1927 and the Hawaiian Department in Honolulu from January 25, 1928 to August 5, 1930. He was assigned as commander of the First Corps Area in Boston on October 7, 1930.

Conner was Pershing's preference for Chief of Staff in 1930, but was passed over in favor of Douglas MacArthur. He was assigned to command First United States Army in 1936 and retired on November 4, 1938 after forty years of service.

Conner's lasting legacy was as a role model and inspiration to World War II high commanders including Marshall, Eisenhower, and George S. Patton. Eisenhower considered Conner to be the greatest soldier he ever knew, saying: "In sheer ability and character, he was the outstanding soldier of my time."

Conner died at Walter Reed Army Medical Center on October 13, 1951. His ashes were scattered at Brandreth Park in the Adirondack Mountains of New York. In addition, there is a cenotaph to his memory at Dale Cemetery in Ossining, New York.

Family
In 1902, Conner married Virginia Brandreth, the daughter of Franklin Brandreth, a successful patent medicine maker from New York, and granddaughter of Benjamin Brandreth. They had three children: daughter Betty Virginia Vida (1903–2000), the wife of Colonel Frank Joseph Vida (1894–1970); son Fox Brandreth (1905–2000), a 1927 graduate of West Point who served as an army lieutenant before pursuing a business career as president of the Brandreth family business, the Allcock Manufacturing Company, a maker of humane animal traps; and daughter Florence Slocum Gans (1910–1964), the wife of Colonel Edgar A. Gans (1902–1965).

Military awards
American awards
 Army Distinguished Service Medal
 Purple Heart
 Spanish War Service Medal
 Army of Cuban Occupation Medal
 Victory Medal

Foreign awards
 Companion of the Order of the Bath
 Commander of the French Legion of Honour
 Commander of the Belgian Order of the Crown
 Commander of the Order of the Crown of Italy
 Croix de Guerre (France)

Dates of rank

References

Bibliography

The Next Middle East War, by Robert Gates, U.S. Secretary of Defense

Further reading

External links

 generalfoxconer.com
 Biography
 Calhoun County site
 Ike and Conner
Steven Rabalais: Conner, Fox, in: 1914-1918-online. International Encyclopedia of the First World War.

1874 births
1951 deaths
People from Calhoun County, Mississippi
American military personnel of the Spanish–American War
United States Army generals of World War I
United States Army generals
Recipients of the Distinguished Service Medal (US Army)
Honorary Companions of the Order of the Bath
Commandeurs of the Légion d'honneur
Commanders of the Order of the Crown (Belgium)
Recipients of the Croix de Guerre 1914–1918 (France)
United States Military Academy alumni
United States Army Command and General Staff College alumni
United States Army War College alumni
Military personnel from Mississippi